Petorca Province is one of eight provinces of the central Chilean region of Valparaíso (V). Its capital is the city of La Ligua.

Administration
As a province, Petorca is a second-level administrative division, governed by a provincial delegate who is appointed by the president.

Communes
The province comprises five communes (Spanish: comunas), each governed by a municipality consisting of an alcalde and municipal council:
La Ligua
Cabildo
Zapallar
Papudo
Petorca

Geography and demography
According to the 2002 census, Petorca is the second least populous province in the region under Isla de Pascua (Easter Island) with a population of 70,610. At that time, there were 50,289 people living in urban areas, 20,321 people living in rural areas, 35,647 men and 34,963 women.

References

External links
 Official link

Provinces of Chile
Provinces of Valparaíso Region
Climbing areas of Chile